Vice Admiral Ovais Ahmed Bilgrami  is a flag officer in the Pakistan Navy. He is currently serving as Commander, Pakistan Fleet in Karachi. Before this he also served as Commander, Karachi, Deputy Chief of the Naval Staff (Operations), Chief Staff Officer to the Commander, Pakistan Fleet and Principal Secretary to the Chief of the Naval Staff.

Career 
Bilgrami was commissioned in the Pakistan Navy with his first appointment at the operations branch in July 1989. He obtained his military education from Britannia Royal Naval College and master's degree in international security and strategy from King’s College London. He graduated from the Pakistan Naval War College, the National Defence University, the Armed Forces of the Philippines Command and General Staff College, and the Royal College of Defence Studies, UK.

His command assignments includes commanding officer PNS Khaibar, while staff assignments includes director National Defence University, Islamabad, director Naval Development Plans, and Operations. He also served as assistant chief of naval staff (operational plans) and additional secretary in the ministry of defence.

Awards and decorations

References 

Living people
Pakistan Navy officers
Graduates of the Royal College of Defence Studies
National Defence University, Pakistan alumni
Pakistan Naval War College alumni
Naval War College alumni
Alumni of King's College London
Graduates of Britannia Royal Naval College
Recipients of Hilal-i-Imtiaz
Year of birth missing (living people)
Place of birth missing (living people)